The Surgeon's loop (a.k.a. Double Loop) is tied the same way as the surgeon's knot but with a double strand. Therefore, this knot does use more line than most. It is a bit bulky but is great for making quick, strong loops at the end of lines and leaders for connecting to other loops.

See also
List of knots

References

External links
Video instructions for tying a Surgeon's Loop

Bend knots